Bernie Christian Halstrom (April 18, 1895 – September 15, 1951)  was an American football halfback who played two seasons for the Chicago Cardinals. He played college football at the University of Illinois for the Illinois Fighting Illini football team.

References

1895 births
1951 deaths
Players of American football from Chicago
American football halfbacks
Illinois Fighting Illini football players
Chicago Cardinals players